Sherly Jeudy (born 13 October 1998) is a Haitian footballer who plays as a forward for Division 2 Féminine club Grenoble and the Haiti national team.

International goals
Scores and results list Haiti's goal tally first

References

External links 
 
 

1998 births
Living people
Women's association football forwards
Haitian women's footballers
People from Ouest (department)
Haiti women's international footballers
GPSO 92 Issy players
Santiago Morning (women) footballers
FC Nantes (women) players
Grenoble Foot 38 (women) players
Haitian expatriate footballers
Haitian expatriate sportspeople in France
Expatriate women's footballers in France
Haitian expatriate sportspeople in Chile
Expatriate women's footballers in Chile